Union of the Centre may refer to:

Union of the Centre (1993), a former centre-right liberal party in Italy
Union of the Centre (2002), a Christian democratic party in Italy
 , a term for a centrist political alliance starting in the 2020 local elections

See also 
 Centre Union (disambiguation)